The Pittsburgh Open was a golf tournament on the LPGA Tour, played only in 1956. It was played at the Churchill Valley Country Club in Pittsburgh, Pennsylvania. Marlene Hagge won the event.

References

Former LPGA Tour events
Golf in Pittsburgh
1956 establishments in Pennsylvania
1956 disestablishments in Pennsylvania
History of women in Pennsylvania